Sibley Lake Dam is a dam in Natchitoches Parish, Louisiana.

History 

The earthen dam was constructed in 1962 with a height of 36 feet and a length at its crest of 6520 feet.  It impounds the Youngs Bayou for municipal water supply for the city of Natchitoches.  The dam is owned and operated by the city and local Water Works District Number One.  Both lake and dam are named for an early settler and Indian agent in the area, Dr. John Sibley.

The reservoir it creates, Sibley Lake, has a water surface of 3.4 square miles, a shoreline of about 38 linear miles, and a maximum capacity of 56,700 acre-feet.  The natural wetlands on this site known as Lac Terre Noir was drained in the early twentieth century, then re-developed as a reservoir and water source.  Recreation on the lake, including hunting, boating, camping, and fishing (for white crappie, channel catfish and largemouth bass) requires an annual permit from the city.

References

External links 
 map of Sibley Lake

Dams in Louisiana
Reservoirs in Louisiana
United States local public utility dams
Buildings and structures in Natchitoches Parish, Louisiana
Dams completed in 1962
Bodies of water of Natchitoches Parish, Louisiana